Forbes Glacier is a glacier entering the west part of Holme Bay on Mawson Coast, to the north of the Casey Range, in the Framnes Mountains of Antarctica. The glacier was mapped by Norwegian cartographers from aerial photographs taken by the Lars Christensen Expedition (1936–37) and called "Brygga" (the wharf). It was renamed by the Australian Antarctic Names and Medals Committee after A. Forbes of the Australian National Antarctic Research Expeditions, who perished on a field trip at Heard Island in 1952.

See also
 List of glaciers in the Antarctic
 Glaciology

References 

Glaciers of Mac. Robertson Land